Africa Speaks! is a 1930 American documentary film directed by Walter Futter and narrated by Lowell Thomas. It is an exploitation film.

Premise
Paul L. Hoefler heads a 1928 expedition to Africa capturing wildlife and tribes on film.

Production
Although the film was shot over the fourteen months of the expedition in the Serengeti and in Uganda, a scene involving an attack by a lion on a native was apparently staged at the Selig Zoo in Los Angeles and involved a toothless lion.

Hoefler wrote a book entitled Africa Speaks about the expedition that was published in 1931.

References in popular culture
The title of the film was parodied in the 1940 cartoon Africa Squeaks and the 1949 Abbott and Costello film Africa Screams.

DVD release 
Africa Speaks was released on Region 0 DVD-R by Alpha Video on July 7, 2015.

See also
Goona-goona epic

References

External links 

1930 documentary films
1930 films
American documentary films
Black-and-white documentary films
Films set in the 1920s
Films set in Africa
Films shot in the Democratic Republic of the Congo
Ethnofiction films
American black-and-white films
Columbia Pictures films
Films shot in Uganda
1930s English-language films
1930s American films